The Faust Overture is a concert overture by German composer Richard Wagner. Wagner originally composed it between 1839 and 1840, intending it to be the first movement of a Faust Symphony based on the play Faust by German playwright Johann Wolfgang von Goethe. Realizing that he would not finish the planned symphony, Wagner revised the piece between 1843 and 1844, incorporating ideas from the other planned movements, and creating instead a single-movement concert overture. He made a final revision in 1855. The work is one of Wagner's few compositions intended for the concert hall, rather than the theatre.

See also 
Faust Symphony by Franz Liszt

References 
Westernhagen, Curt von. Wagner: A Biography. Cambridge University Press: New York, NY 1978.
Culshaw, John. Wagner: The Man and His Music. Dutton: New York, NY 1978. 
Oxford Concise Dictionary of Music, 1996 ed. Chief editor Michael Kennedy.
Everett, Derrick. , 2004.
Wagner, Irmgard. , American Goethe Society 2004.

External links
 

Compositions by Richard Wagner
Concert overtures
Music based on Goethe's Faust
1844 compositions
1855 compositions